Higashi Nihon Immigration Center (also known as East Japan Immigration Center, or Ushiku Detention Center) is one of three immigration detention centers of Japan operated by Ministry of Justice and located in Ushiku, Ibaraki prefecture.   It houses approximately 700 people both of males and females.   It opened in 1993 for the exceeded capacity of Yokohama Immigration Detention Center. There have been claims among the human rights activists of inmates being detained for lengthy periods.   March 11, 2011, because of the 2011 Tōhoku earthquake and tsunami the old facility was closed.

References

 Hunger strike at immigration center, May 13, 2010

External links
Higashi-Nihon Immigration Center

Immigration detention centers and prisons
Immigration to Japan
Illegal immigration to Asia
Human rights in Japan
Human rights abuses in Japan